Thomas Kiernan (20 October 1918 – 26 June 1991) was a Scottish footballer who played in the Football League for Luton Town and Stoke City. He also played for Albion Rovers, Alloa Athletic and Celtic.

Career
Kiernan was born in Coatbridge and began his career with Clydebank Juniors in 1936 before joining Albion Rovers a year later. He scored 24 goals for the Wee Rovers in two seasons prior to the outbreak of World War II and earned a move to Celtic after the war ended, where he spent one season before he was signed by English club Stoke City for a then club record fee of £8,500. He was a regular at inside right under the management of Bob McGrory in 1947–48 playing in 26 matches scoring six goals as Stoke a frustrating season finishing in 15th position. After playing just four matches at the start of 1948–49 Kiernan was then sold to Second Division Luton Town in November 1948 for £6,000. With the "Hatters" Kiernan played in three seasons scoring 15 goals in 60 matches before he returned to Scotland in 1950 with St Mirren. After a brief spell in Wales with Barry Town and made a return to Albion Rovers and ended his career with Alloa Athletic.

Career statistics
Source:

References

External links
 

Scottish footballers
Stoke City F.C. players
English Football League players
1918 births
1991 deaths
Clydebank Juniors F.C. players
Celtic F.C. players
Luton Town F.C. players
St Mirren F.C. players
Barry Town United F.C. players
Albion Rovers F.C. players
Alloa Athletic F.C. players
Scottish Football League players
Scottish Football League representative players
Chelsea F.C. wartime guest players
Brentford F.C. wartime guest players
Association football inside forwards
Footballers from Coatbridge
Scottish Junior Football Association players